Jonis Bascir (born 17 September 1960) is a Somali-Italian actor and musician.

Personal life
Jonis is the son of Muheddin Hagi Bascir, and was born in Rome in 1960. His father is Somali and his mother is Italian.

Growing up, Jonis lived between six and ten years in Somalia.

He is the grandson of Haji Bashir Ismail Yusuf, the first President of the Somali National Assembly.

Jonis  is married to Nicoletta.

Career
Professionally, Jonis is best known for his role in Un medico in famiglia (1998–2008), a Rai 1 television series. He has also appeared in The Stone Merchant (2006), Anita Garibaldi (2012) and Regalo a sorpresa (2013).

Additionally, Jonis regularly performs with his own band.

He has been a spokesperson for the Kosè coffee brand.

Filmography

Cinema
 Stupor Mundi, directed by Pasquale Squitieri (1997)
 Simpatici & antipatici, directed by Christian De Sica (1998)
 Comunque mia, directed by Sabrina Paravicini (2004)
 The Stone Merchant, directed by Renzo Martinelli (2006)
 Il mercante di stoffe, directed by Antonio Baiocco (2009)
 Regalo a sorpresa, directed by Fabrizio Casini (2013)
 Buongiorno papà, directed by Edoardo Leo (2013)
 Una Diecimilalire, directed by Luciano Luminellii (2013–2014)
 Tre tocchi, directed by Marco Risi (2013)
 Non c'è due senza te, directed by Massimo Cappelli (2014)
 Ustica - The missing paper, directed by Renzo Martinelli (2015)
 Come si fa a vivere così, directed by Loredana Cannata (2016/2017)
 Se son rose, directed by Leonardo Pieraccioni (2018)

Short films
 Le 5 forze di Porter, directed by Massimo Cappelli (1996)
 Il tuo paradiso, directed by Riccardo Acerbi (1997)
 Toilette, directed by Massimo Cappelli (1999)
 Il sinfamolle, directed by Massimo Cappelli (2001)
 Amalia, directed by Biagio Fersini (2012)

Television
 Di che vizio sei?, directed by Gigi Proietti (1988)
 Villa Arzilla, directed by Gigi Proietti (1990)
 Il caso Bebawi, directed by Valerio Jalongo (1996)
 Il commissario Montalbano: Il ladro di merendine, directed by Alberto Sironi (1998)
 Incantesimo - serie TV, 1 episodio (2001)
 Padri, directed by Riccardo Donna (2002)
 Soraya, directed by Lodovico Gasparini (2003)
 Empire - mini-serie TV, 1 episodio (2005)
 Un posto al sole - 1 episodio (2005)
 Un medico in famiglia - serie TV (1998–2007)
 Due imbroglioni e... mezzo! 2 (2010)
 La ladra - serie TV, 1 episodio (2010)
 Il commissario Rex - serie TV, 1 episodio (2011)
 Anita Garibaldi, directed by Claudio Bonivento (2012)
 Il caso Enzo Tortora - Dove eravamo rimasti?, directed by Ricky Tognazzi (2012)
 Roma nuda, directed by Giuseppe Ferrara (2013)
 Centovetrine(2015)
 Il sistema - miniserie TV directed by Carmine Elia (2015)

Music videos
 Jermaine Jackson e Pia Zadora - "When the Rain Begins to Fall"
 Mike Francis - Ma Lo Sai?
 Alex Britti - Festa
 Piji Siciliani - La mia bella di domenica
 Inverso - La Pioggia Che Non Cade

Music
 1990 Lavori In Corso Blues Band
 1992 Tour Giappone Italian Pret A Porter
 1995 High Spirit (Gospel)
 1995 The Platters
 1996 Carràmba! Che sorpresa singer
 1999 Attenti Alla Noia short directed by Riccardo Acerbi - soundtrack
 1999 Jonis And The Supersoulfighters (Tribute to) Lenny Kravitz
 2005 Gli Io Stasera Mi Butto It's only Rhythm and Blues
 2005 Un posto al sole -  Rai 3 guitarist
 2006 Jonistorie Original
 2007 Senza docu-film directed by Sabrina Paravicini - soundtrack
 2007 Un medico in famiglia Rai 1 - sing his song Tell me just one thing and others songs
 2007 "Without" CD soundtrack
 2010 L'Estasi dell'Anima - soundtrack
 2012 BEIGE - L'importanza di essere diverso -soundtrack
 2013 Il Treno del Blues with Jona's Blues Band
 2014 Tre tocchi, directed by Marco Risi - soundtrack
 2014 Non c'è due senza te, directed by Massimo Cappelli - soundtrack
 2015 L'Appartamento, directed by Vanessa Gasbarri - soundtrack
 2015 Dall'alto di una fredda torre, directed by Francesco Frangipane - soundtrack
 2015 Il Grande Male, directed by Sargis Galstyan - soundtrack
 2015 Autunno e Inverno directed by Francesco Frangipane - soundtrack
 2016 Spot Against Drugs directed by Marco Bonini - soundtrack
 2016 Ritratti di Signora directed by Vanessa Gasbarri - soundtrack
 2016 Ostaggi directed by Angelo Longoni - soundtrack
 2016/2017 Rosso Giungla directed by Vanessa Gasbarri - soundtrack
 2017 Risiko regia di Vanessa Gasbarri - soundtrack
 2017 Boomerang regia di Angelo Longoni - soundtrack
 2018 Tu mi nascondi qualcosa regia di Giuseppe Loconsole - soundtrack
 2018 Ti racconto una storia con Edoardo Leo - soundtrack
 2018 Affiliazione short directed by Gianluca Blumetti - soundtrack
 2018 Verticale di 6 short directed by Massimiliano Pazzaglia - soundtrack
 2019 Bahlsen Spot TV soundtrack

See also
Elisa Kadigia Bove
Saba Anglana

Notes

References
CinemaRx - Jonas Bashir

External links

Official website
Jonis Bascir - Music

1960 births
Living people
Somalian male actors
Italian male film actors
Somalian musicians
Italian musicians
Italian people of Somali descent
Musicians from Rome
Italian male television actors